Alejandra Jiménez Ayala (born 29 August 1987) is a Mexican professional boxer. She is a former two-weight world champion, having held the WBC heavyweight title from 2016 to 2018; the WBO super middleweight title from January to March 2020; and the WBC super middleweight title from January to February 2020 after being suspended for a failed drug test.

Jiménez took up boxing at the age of 23 in order to lose weight and went on to become a world champion less than four years later. Before turning pro Jiménez won ten amateur bouts, half of them coming against male boxers. Jiménez is the former WBC female heavyweight champion and the second Mexican born boxer to hold a world heavyweight title, first being Martha Salazar who Jiménez won the title from.

In December 2022, Jiménez abruptly retired from professional boxing amid allegations that she was born male. In response to the allegations, Jiménez stated that she has hypothyroidism.

Professional boxing record

References

External links

1987 births
Living people
World boxing champions
Mexican women boxers
Boxers from Mexico City
Heavyweight boxers